Parliamentary elections were held in Portugal on 29 June 1884. The result was a victory for the Regeneration Party, which won 110 seats.

Results

The results exclude the six seats won at national level and those from overseas territories.

References

Legislative elections in Portugal
Portugal
1884 in Portugal
June 1884 events